The Henry J. Kaiser class is an American class of eighteen fleet replenishment oilers which began construction in August 1984. The class comprises fifteen oilers which are operated by Military Sealift Command to provide underway replenishment of fuel to United States Navy combat ships and jet fuel for aircraft aboard aircraft carriers at sea. One ship, operated by the United States from 1987 to 1996, was sold to Chile in 2009 and commissioned into the Chilean Navy in 2010; and two ships were scrapped in 2011 while still incomplete.

Technical overview 
There are stations on both sides of each ship for underway replenishment of fuel and stores. The ships in this class have a small capacity to carry and transfer fresh and frozen foods as well as other materials, and have two dry cargo transfer rigs.

Construction program 

The circumstances of the construction program were convoluted and it is worthwhile to spell them out here. The original contract, for T-AO 187, was awarded to Avondale Industries, (Avondale), on November 12, 1982: this contract included options for T-AOs 188, 189 and 190, which were exercised on January 20, 1983, (T-AO 188) and November 22, 1983, (T-AOs 189 and 190). A second-source contract, for T-AOs 191 and 192, was awarded to Pennsylvania Shipbuilding Company, (Penn Ship), on May 6, 1985.  This contract included options for T-AOs 194 and 196, which were never exercised: after Penn Ship began to have cash flow problems, the Navy transferred these options from Penn Ship's contract to Avondale's contract and exercised them on June 16, 1988. Additional options on Avondale's contract were executed on June 28, 1985, for T-AO 193, on February 27, 1986, for T-AO 195; on February 12, 1987, for T-AO 197; on June 20, 1988, for T-AO 198; on October 6, 1988, for T-AOs 200, 202 and 204; and on March 24, 1989, for T-AOs 199, 201 and 203.

The Navy's contract with Penn Ship for T-AOs 191 and 192 was terminated before the ships were complete and a new contract was executed with Tampa Shipyards, Inc., of Tampa FL, a division of the American Ship Building Company. (Note that this company should not be confused with Tampa Shipbuilding Company, (TASCO), which was a totally different entity, at a different location, long gone by 1989.) Disputes over corrective construction and materials costs between the U.S. Navy and Tampa Shipyards resulted in termination of this contract in 1993, when T-AO 191 was said to be 95% complete and T-AO 192 84% complete. The Navy then determined that the ships were no longer needed as oilers, and undertook a study of the feasibility of converting them to ammunition ships. This study concluded that such a conversion was cost-prohibitive and the ships were placed in long-term storage in an incomplete condition. They were sold for recycling in 2011.

Naming 

The class is named for its lead unit, which in turn is named for the American industrialist and shipbuilder Henry J. Kaiser (1882–1967). The first nine ships were named for American shipbuilders, inventors, naval architects, and aeronautical engineers who played important roles in the history of the U.S. Navy. The tenth through eighteenth ships were named after American rivers, which is a more traditional naming convention for U.S. Navy oilers.

Operations 

In U.S. Navy service, the ships serve in a non-commissioned status in the Military Sealift Command, with primarily civilian crews, and as such, they are prefixed as "USNS" instead of "USS", as commissioned ships are. After joining the fleet, the 16 completed ships all saw active service between 1986 and 1996, when  became the first unit of the class to be laid up. Since then, some of the others have also spent periods out of service in reserve or in a limited operational status.

Foreign transfer 

Andrew J. Higgins never re-entered U.S. service after being laid up in 1996. She was sold to Chile in 2009 and was commissioned into the Chilean Navy in 2010 as Almirante Montt.

Ships

References

External links

 

Auxiliary replenishment ship classes
 
Ships of the United States Navy